Deytheur Grammar School was opened in 1896 at  Llansantffraid-ym-Mechain, Wales. Notable pupils included John Fraser Drummond DFC a Battle of Britain ace  and The Ven. Arthur White, the Archdeacon of Warrington from 1947  until 1958.

Notes

Educational institutions established in 1896
Education in Wales
People educated at Deytheur Grammar School
1896 establishments in Wales